The Cork–Donegal rivalry is a Gaelic football rivalry between Irish county teams Cork and Donegal, whose first championship meeting was in 2006. The fixture has been an infrequent one in the history of the championship, and therefore the rivalry is not as intense between the two teams. Cork's home ground is Páirc Uí Chaoimh and Donegal's home ground is MacCumhaill Park; however, all of their championship meetings have been held at neutral venues, usually Croke Park.

While Cork have the second highest number of Munster titles and Donegal are sixth on the roll of honour in Ulster, they have also enjoyed success in the All-Ireland Senior Football Championship, having won 9 championship titles between them to date.

Statistics

All-time results

Legend

Senior

Junior

Minor

Records

Scorelines

 Biggest championship win:
 For Cork: Cork 1-27 - 2-10 Donegal, All-Ireland quarter-final, Croke Park, 2 August 2009
 For Donegal: Donegal 0-16 - 1-11 Cork, All-Ireland semi-final, Croke Park, 26 August 2012
 Highest aggregate:
 Cork 1-27 - 2-10 Donegal, All-Ireland quarter-final, Croke Park, 2 August 2009

Top scorers

Attendance

Highest attendance:
55,169 - Donegal 0-16 - 1-11 Cork, All-Ireland semi-final, Croke Park, 26 August 2012

References

Donegal
Donegal county football team rivalries